Hugh McCluggage (born 3 March 1998) is a professional Australian rules footballer and vice-captain of the Brisbane Lions in the Australian Football League (AFL).

Early life
McCluggage was raised in Allansford, Victoria and participated in the Auskick program there before playing junior football with the Allansford Football Club in the Warrnambool District Football League. In addition to Australian rules, McCluggage also played junior cricket, hockey, and soccer.

McCluggage played senior Australian rules with South Warrnambool Football Club in the Hampden Football Netball League. He represented Vic Country in the AFL Under-18 Championships and played under 18 football with the North Ballarat Rebels in the TAC Cup winning the Morrish Medal despite playing only 10 matches.

He was drafted by Brisbane with their first selection and third overall in the 2016 national draft.

AFL Career
He made his debut in the thirty-one point loss against  at Etihad Stadium in round three of the 2017 season.

Statistics
Updated to the end of the 2022 season.

|-
| 2017 ||  || 6
| 18 || 8 || 15 || 152 || 120 || 272 || 70 || 36 || 0.4 || 0.8 || 8.4 || 6.7 || 15.1 || 3.9 || 2.0 || 0
|-
| 2018 ||  || 6
| 22 || 10 || 9 || 240 || 186 || 426 || 96 || 68 || 0.5 || 0.4 || 10.9 || 8.5 || 19.4 || 4.4 || 3.1 || 1
|-
| 2019 ||  || 6
| 23 || 23 || 14 || 320 || 201 || 521 || 90 || 84 || 1.0 || 0.6 || 13.9 || 8.7 || 22.7 || 3.9 || 3.7 || 5
|-
| 2020 ||  || 6
| 19 || 8 || 21 || 219 || 136 || 355 || 70 || 52 || 0.4 || 1.1 || 11.5 || 7.2 || 18.7 || 3.7 || 2.7 || 4
|-
| 2021 ||  || 6
| 24 || 15 || 22 || 407 || 193 || 600 || 123 || 89 || 0.6 || 0.9 || 17.0 || 8.0 || 25.0 || 5.1 || 3.7 || 10
|-
| 2022 ||  || 6
| 24 || 20 || 18 || 341 || 251 || 592 || 127 || 116 || 0.8 || 0.8 || 14.2 || 10.5 || 24.7 || 5.3 || 4.8 || 14
|- class=sortbottom
! colspan=3 | Career
! 130 !! 84 !! 99 !! 1679 !! 1087 !! 2766 !! 576 !! 445 !! 0.6 !! 0.8 !! 12.9 !! 8.4 !! 21.3 !! 4.4 !! 3.4 !! 34
|}

Notes

Honours and achievements
Individual
 2× 22under22 team: 2019, 2020
 AFL Rising Star nominee: 2017 (round 14)

References

External links

1998 births
Living people
Brisbane Lions players
Greater Western Victoria Rebels players
Australian rules footballers from Victoria (Australia)